Fordcombe  is a village within the civil parish of Penshurst in the Sevenoaks district of Kent, England. The village is located on the northern slopes of the Weald, five miles (8 km) west of Royal Tunbridge Wells.

The church, part of a united benefice with Penshurst, Chiddingstone and Chiddingstone Causeway, is dedicated to St Peter. Several members of the Hardinge family are buried in the churchyard:

 Henry Hardinge, 1st Viscount Hardinge (1785–1856), British Army Field Marshal, Governor-General of India
 Charles Hardinge, 2nd Viscount Hardinge (1822–1894), British politician
 Charles Hardinge, 1st Baron Hardinge of Penshurst (1858–1944), British diplomat and statesman, Viceroy of India
 Alexander Hardinge, 2nd Baron Hardinge of Penshurst (1894–1960), British Army officer and courtier
 Sir Arthur Edward Hardinge (1828–1892), British Army general, Governor of Gibraltar
 Sir Arthur Henry Hardinge (1859–1933), British diplomat

The Chafford Arms pub is at the heart of the village.

External links

 

Villages in Kent
Penshurst